Joan Claire Tronto (born June 29, 1952), is professor of political science at the University of Minnesota, and was previously professor of women's studies and political science at Hunter College and the Graduate School, City University of New York.

Education 
Tronto gained her degree from Oberlin College in 1974. She passed both her masters and her Ph.D at Princeton University in 1976 and 1981 respectively.

Research 
Tronto's research fields range from political theories, gender and the ethic of care, to political thought.

Bibliography

Books 
 
 
 
  (Fabienne Brugère, translator)
 
  Details.

Chapters in books

Journal articles

See also 
 Ethics of care

References

External links 
 Profile page: Joan Tronto University of Minnesota

1952 births
American women political scientists
American political scientists
American ethicists
Feminist philosophers
Graduate Center, CUNY faculty
Hunter College faculty
Oberlin College alumni
Princeton University alumni
University of Minnesota faculty
Living people
American women academics
21st-century American women